Colin Bonitto (1918 – July 1974) was a Jamaican cricketer. He played in seven first-class matches for the Jamaican cricket team from 1946 and 1953.

See also
 List of Jamaican representative cricketers

References

External links
 

1918 births
1974 deaths
Jamaican cricketers
Jamaica cricketers
Place of birth missing